Brandon Loupos (born 27 March 1993) is an Australian BMX cyclist.

He won two medals, in the freestyle park event, at the World Urban Cycling Championships, gold in 2019 and bronze in 2018.

References

External links
 

1993 births
Living people
Australian male cyclists
BMX riders
X Games athletes